Amber Mildred Ruffin (born January 9, 1979) is an American comedian. She hosts her own late-night talk show titled The Amber Ruffin Show on NBC and Peacock. She has been a writer for Late Night with Seth Meyers since 2014. When she joined the show she became the first Black woman to write for a late-night network talk show in the United States.

In January 2021, she co-authored a book with her sister Lacey Lamar titled You'll Never Believe What Happened to Lacey: Crazy Stories about Racism which made the New York Times Best Seller list. They released a second book, The World Record Book of Racist Stories, in 2022. In 2022, Ruffin and her writing partner Jenny Hagel, co-founded their production company Straight to Cards under their overall deal with Universal Television.

Early life and education
Ruffin was born in Omaha, Nebraska. She graduated from Benson High School in 1996.  Ruffin is the youngest of five children. As a child Ruffin learned Signing Exact English to communicate with a deaf neighbor.

Career
In 2001, Ruffin began performing in local theater productions and improv in Omaha. While performing with her improv troupe at an event in Chicago, Ruffin met comedian and owner of iO Theater Charna Halpern. Halpern encouraged Ruffin to move to Chicago saying she believed Ruffin would "have a full-time job, doing comedy, within the year". In 2008 after finishing her classes at iO, Ruffin moved to Amsterdam to work as a writer and performer on the improv comedy troupe Boom Chicago Amsterdam.

After returning to the United States, Ruffin performed as part of The Second City in both Denver and Chicago, where she first met future Late Night co-writer Jenny Hagel. In 2011, she moved to Los Angeles; joined the YouTube comedy group RobotDown featuring Jessica Lowe, Carlo Corbellini, and Davey Vorhes; and appeared on an episode of Key & Peele. She also joined the nationally recognized sketch and musical comedy troupe Story Pirates, where she performed sketches based on stories written by kids. Ruffin was also a member of Sacred Fools Theater Company performing a serialized version of King of Kong: A Musical Parody, a two-woman show parodying the documentary The King of Kong. The musical was co-written with co-star Lauren Van Kurin and directed by fellow Boom Chicago alum Brendan Hunt, with music by David Schmoll. King of Kong appeared at the 2014 New York International Fringe Festival winning Best Overall Musical 2014, and the 2015 Hollywood Fringe Festival (with Hunt subbing for an unavailable Ruffin), where it won Best Musical & Outstanding Songwriting. The show returned to Sacred Fools in September 2016 for a performance attended by parody target Billy Mitchell himself.

In 2013, Saturday Night Live received backlash for not having any Black women on the cast. Ruffin auditioned for the show in 2014 alongside Tiffany Haddish, Leslie Jones, Gabrielle Dennis, Nicole Byer, Simone Shepherd, and Bresha Webb. Ruffin was unsuccessful in her audition. A few days later Seth Meyers called to ask her to be a writer on his new late night show. Ruffin has been a writer on Late Night with Seth Meyers since the show's start in 2014. In addition to writing she also appears in several recurring segments on the program including: "Amber Says What?", "Amber's Minute of Fury", "Jokes Seth Can't Tell" (with fellow writer Jenny Hagel), and "Point, Counterpoint". When the  George Floyd protests began, Ruffin opened a week's worth of shows by retelling her experiences with police officers and police brutality. Meyers interviewed Ruffin as a guest for the show's 1,000th episode.

When not writing for Late Night, Ruffin wrote for the Comedy Central show Detroiters and was a regular narrator on the Comedy Central show Drunk History. In 2017, Ruffin developed a single-camera comedy show, Going Dutch, but the series was not ordered. She was nominated for a Writers Guild of America award in the category "Comedy/Variety (Including Talk) Series" in 2017.

In February 2018, Ruffin hosted the 70th Writers Guild of America awards ceremony.

In 2019, NBC ordered a pilot presentation for Ruffin's single-camera comedy series Village Gazette. In the same year Ruffin was a writer for the first season of A Black Lady Sketch Show on HBO.

On January 16, 2020, it was announced that Ruffin would host her own late-night talk show on NBC's streaming service Peacock titled The Amber Ruffin Show. The show premiered on September 25, 2020. The show breaks away from the typical late night structure, foregoing guests, and focusing instead on topical sketches. The show was nominated for a Writers Guild of America award in the category "Comedy/Variety Sketch Series" in 2021. The show was also nominated for Outstanding Writing for a Variety Series at the 73rd Primetime Emmy Awards.

Ruffin and her sister Lacey Lamar co-authored a book, titled You'll Never Believe What Happened to Lacey: Crazy Stories about Racism, which was released on January 12, 2021, and was placed on the New York Times Best Seller list.

In February 2021, it was announced that Ruffin was set to co-write the Broadway-bound musical adaptation of Some Like It Hot alongside Matthew Lopez.

In September 2022, it was revealed that Ruffin would be the voice actor of Purple, the new spokescandy for M&M's.

Personal life

Ruffin married Dutch painter Jan Schiltmeijer in 2010.

Filmography
 2010: Ox Tales — Voice actor (2nd English dub)
 2012: RobotDown (TV Series) – Producer, Writer (5 episodes), Actor in various parts (6 episodes)
 2012: Key & Peele (TV Series) – Party Wife (1 episode: Episode #2.9)
 2012–2013: Animation Domination High-Def (TV Series short) – various, Misty (voice) (3 episodes)
 2014: Wish It Inc. (TV Series) – Shari (12 episodes)
 2014: 66th Primetime Emmy Awards (TV Special) – Written By
 2014–present: Late Night with Seth Meyers (TV series) – written by (175+ episodes)
 2015: Above Average Presents (TV Series) – Nurse (1 episode: "Unique Hospital: The Surgery Results")
 2017–2018: Detroiters (TV series) – Written By (3 episodes); Molly (2 episodes)
 2018: 75th Golden Globe Awards (TV Special) – Writer
 2019: Tuca & Bertie (TV series) – Dakota (voice) (1 episode: "The New Bird")
 2019: Drunk History (TV series) – Barbara Cooke (1 episode: "Legacies")
 2019: You're Not a Monster (TV Series) – Mermaid / Gremlin (2 episodes)
 2019: 76th Golden Globe Awards (TV Special) – Writer
 2019: A Black Lady Sketch Show (TV Series) – Writer (6 episodes)
 2020: Escape from Virtual Island (Audible Original - Audio Comedy) (TV Series) – Faith (voice) (11 episodes)
 2020: Village Gazette (TV Movie) – Executive producer, Writer, Actress
 2020–present: The Amber Ruffin Show - Host, Writer
 2022: Would I Lie to You? (US) (TV Series) - Herself (1 episode: "Babysitting Lemurs")
 2022: Girls5eva - T.K. (1 episode)
 2022: Gutsy - Herself (Episode TBA)

Bibliography

Honors
2018: Crain's New York Business, 40 Under 40
2021: New York Times Best Seller, Hardcover Nonfiction
2021: Time100 Next

See also
 New Yorkers in journalism

References

External links
 The Amber Ruffin Show on Peacock

 

1979 births
21st-century American comedians
21st-century American screenwriters
21st-century American women writers
African-American female comedians
African-American screenwriters
American comedy writers
American expatriates in the Netherlands
American television talk show hosts
American television writers
American women comedians
Comedians from Nebraska
Late Night with Seth Meyers
Late night television talk show hosts
Living people
Writers from Omaha, Nebraska
African-American television talk show hosts
21st-century African-American women writers
21st-century African-American writers
Screenwriters from Nebraska
20th-century African-American people
20th-century African-American women